Jonathan Vaughn (born 1981) has been Assistant Organist of Wells Cathedral since September 2007. He has also held musical posts at St George's Chapel, Windsor and St Edmundsbury Cathedral

Early life and education
Whilst still at school, Vaughn was organ scholar of Croydon Parish Church; during this time, aged sixteen, he became a prizewinning Fellow of the Royal College of Organists. His gap year was spent as the organ scholar of St George's Chapel, Windsor, before he started as an organ scholar at St John's College, Cambridge, where he read for a degree in music. He stayed on at St John's, for another year, as Assistant Organist. He studied the organ with Dame Gillian Weir whilst at Cambridge.

Career

St Edmundsbury
In September 2004, Vaughn was appointed Assistant Director of Music of St Edmundsbury Cathedral, after Michael Bawtree left to study choral conducting at the Royal Scottish Academy of Music and Drama. He also was the Cathedral's Arts Co-ordinator and Musical Director of the Phoenix Singers, Framlingham. After three years, he was appointed Assistant Organist of Wells Cathedral.

Wells
For the past seven years, Vaughn has been Assistant Organist of Wells Cathedral. He has recorded five CDs with the cathedral choir and one with The Exon Singers - all under the direction of Matthew Owens.

Discography
2013 - Wagner at the Organ, for Regent Records
2012 - Bingham: Choral Music, with Matthew Owens and Wells Cathedral Choir, for Hyperion Records
2012 - Jingle Wells, with Matthew Owens, Owain Park (organ) and Wells Cathedral Choir, for Regent Records
2011 - Songs of Sunshine, with Matthew Owens, and Wells Cathedral Choir, for Regent Records
2011 - Macmillan: Choral Music, with Matthew Owens and Wells Cathedral Choir, for Hyperion Records
2010 - Flame Celestial - Choral Music of David Bednall, Vol II, with Matthew Owens and Wells Cathedral Choir, for Regent Records
2010 - Choral Music by Jonathan Dove, with Matthew Owens and Wells Cathedral Choir, for Hyperion Records
2010 - Awake up my glory – choral and organ music by Philip Moore, with Matthew Owens, Susan Hamilton (soprano) and The Exon Singers, for Regent Records
2009 - Mathias: Choral Music, with Matthew Owens and Wells Cathedral Choir, for Hyperion Records
2004 - WOOD, C.: St. Mark Passion, with Daniel Hyde and the Choir of St John's College, Cambridge, for Naxos Records
2004 - ELGAR: Sacred Choral Music, with Christopher Robinson and the Choir of St John's College, Cambridge, for Naxos Records
2003 - BERKELEY: Sacred Choral Music, with Christopher Robinson and the Choir of St John's College, Cambridge, for Naxos Records
1997 - Day By Day - Choral & Organ Music of Martin How, with Peter Nardone, Martin How (organ) and Croydon Parish Church Choir, for Regent Records

References

1981 births
Living people
Alumni of St John's College, Cambridge
English classical organists
British male organists
Cathedral organists
21st-century organists
21st-century British male musicians
Male classical organists